Paul Martyn Eales (born 2 August 1963) is an English professional golfer.

Career
Eales was born in Epping, Essex. He turned professional in 1985 and became a member of Europe's second tier Challenge Tour in 1990. The following season he won the Audi Open, and in 1992 finished third on the Challenge Tour Rankings to graduate to the main European Tour for the 1993 season.

After a solid rookie season in 1993, Eales won the 1994 Extremadura Open on his way to a career best 35th place on the European Tour Order of Merit. He performed consistently, but without winning again, mostly finishing within the top 100 on the Order of Merit until 2004, when he lost his tour card.

Eales was the assistant professional to Eddie Birchenough at Royal Lytham & St Annes Golf Club, where he first became an assistant in 1987.

Eales is now playing on the European Senior Tour. He won the Scottish Senior Open in August 2016 and the Jamaica Open in January 2017.

Eales is a Non-Executive Board member of the European Tour. He regularly works as a broadcaster and golf analyst for various media companies including BBC Radio 5 Live and Sky Sports.

Professional wins (4)

European Tour wins (1)

Challenge Tour wins (1)
1991 Audi Open

Other wins (1)

European Senior Tour wins (1)

Results in major championships

Note: Eales never played in the Masters Tournament or the PGA Championship.

CUT = missed the half-way cut
"T" = tied

References

External links

English male golfers
European Tour golfers
Sunshine Tour golfers
European Senior Tour golfers
People from Epping
1963 births
Living people